Nick Cullen (born 10 April 1984) is an Australian professional golfer who plays on the PGA Tour of Australasia. 

Cullen played on the Canadian Tour in 2010 and has played on the PGA Tour of Australasia since 2011. He earned his first professional win at the Enjoy Jakarta Indonesia Open on the OneAsia Tour in March 2012.

He also qualified for the 2012 Open Championship through International Final Qualifying.

In August 2013, Cullen won his first title on the PGA Tour of Australasia at the Isuzu Queensland Open. He beat countryman Peter O'Malley by five strokes.

The following year, he won one of the PGA Tour of Australia's big three tournaments, in the BetEasy Masters. He prevailed by a single stroke over three players, including Adam Scott.

In 2015, Cullen lost in a playoff to Richard Green at the Oates Vic Open.

A tie for fifth place finish at the 2015 Emirates Australian Open was good enough to see Cullen claim one of the three available spots for 2016 Open Championship.

Professional wins (3)

PGA Tour of Australasia wins (2) 

PGA Tour of Australasia playoff record (0–1)

OneAsia Tour wins (1)

Results in major championships

CUT = missed the halfway cut

Results in World Golf Championships

"T" = Tied

Team appearances
Amateur
Australian Men's Interstate Teams Matches (representing South Australia): 2006, 2007, 2008

See also
2018 European Tour Qualifying School graduates

References

External links

Nick Cullen player profile on Golf Australia website

Australian male golfers
PGA Tour of Australasia golfers
Left-handed golfers
Sportspeople from Adelaide
1984 births
Living people